Sean Akira Davis (born February 8, 1993) is an American professional soccer player who plays as a midfielder for Nashville SC of Major League Soccer.

Early life

Youth
Born in Long Branch, Davis was a member of several youth clubs growing up, including the Holmdel Bulldogs, the NJSA 04 Academy, the Match Fit Academy and the New York Red Bulls academy.

Early career

College
Davis was a two-time captain at Duke University, where he made a total of 65 appearances for the Blue Devils. He led the Atlantic Coast Conference in assists his senior year. Davis was a three-time All-ACC selection, a three-time member of the All-ACC Academic Team, the 2014 ACC Midfielder of the Year, a CoSIDA Academic All-America First Team selection, and a Lowe's Senior Class First Team honoree.

He also played in the Premier Development League for Carolina Dynamo in 2013. During the 2014 summer season, Davis played for the New York Red Bulls U-23 in the National Premier Soccer League. He helped the team capture the 2014 NPSL title appearing as a starter in the league final, where he registered the game winning assist.

Club career

New York Red Bulls
On December 11, 2014, Davis signed a homegrown contract with the New York Red Bulls, making him the ninth homegrown signing in club history.

2015
On April 4, 2015, he made his professional debut for USL affiliate club New York Red Bulls II, helping the team secure its first ever victory with a 4–1 win over Toronto FC II. Davis assisted the first ever goal scored for the New York Red Bulls II, with a feed to Anatole Abang.

On April 17, 2015, Davis made his MLS debut in a 2–0 victory over the San Jose Earthquakes, coming on as a substitute in the 86th minute for Sacha Kljestan. Shortly after his debut, Davis received his first start on May 2, 2015, in a 2–1 loss to the New England Revolution. Davis scored his first professional goal against the Atlanta Silverbacks in the U.S. Open Cup. He received Man of the Match honors for his efforts. On July 23, 2015, Davis led New York to a 4–2 victory over Premier League Champions Chelsea F.C. in a 2015 International Champions Cup match, scoring two goals in the victory. On July 28, 2015, Davis started and played 45 minutes in the 2015 Chipotle Homegrown Game at Dick's Sporting Goods Park. The team was coached by Landon Donovan. Davis' contributions off the bench during the 2015 season helped lead New York to their second Supporters' Shield in two years.

2016
On August 12, 2016, Davis scored his first MLS goal in a 2–2 draw against the LA Galaxy. A week later, on August 13, Davis scored his second goal of the season and assisted on two others in a 3–1 victory over Montreal Impact. Davis was later named to the MLS Team of the Week for his performance. In the league's annual 24 Under 24 series, Davis was ranked as the 22nd best player under the age of 24 in the league; drawing praise from pundits about his intelligence and ability to read the game.

Davis played every minute of the group stage as the New York Red Bulls qualified for the CONCACAF Champions League quarter finals for the first time in club history.

2017
On July 19, 2017, Davis opened the scoring for New York in a 5–1 victory over San Jose Earthquakes. On August 12, Davis recorded a goal and an assist in a 3–1 victory over Orlando City SC. In 2017, Davis appeared in a career high 30 MLS matches, including 23 starts.

2018
On March 1, 2018, Davis scored the second goal of the match for New York in a 2–0 victory over Olimpia in the CONCACAF Champions League. With the victory New York advanced to the Champions League Quarterfinals for the first time in club history.

On March 6, 2018, Davis started and played 90 minutes for New York in a 2–0 victory over Club Tijuana in the CONCACAF Champions League Quarter Finals. The New York Red Bulls made history that night, becoming the first Major League Soccer side to defeat a Liga MX team away in the knockout round of CONCACAF Champions League.

2019
On February 27, 2019, Davis scored his  first goal of the season in 3–0 victory over Atlético Pantoja in the 2019 CONCACAF Champions League.

2020
On February 27, 2020, Davis was named captain of the club, the first homegrown player to do so. On August 20, Davis recorded his 100th MLS regular season start in a 1–0 win against NYCFC. He became the club's first homegrown player to ever reach this milestone.

2021
On October 2, 2021, Davis made his 200th appearance for the New York Red Bulls. He was only the third player in club history to reach this milestone, and the first ever homegrown player. By season's end, he also became the first midfielder in franchise history to play every minute of an MLS regular season. Davis led the team to their second straight playoff since becoming captain in the season prior.

Nashville SC 
On January 4, 2022, Davis signed with Nashville SC on a three-year deal as a free agent.

International career
Davis was a member of the U.S. under-17 residency program from 2008 to 2009.

Career statistics

Honors
New York Red Bulls
MLS Supporters' Shield: 2015, 2018

New York Red Bulls II
USL Cup: 2016

References

External links

Duke University bio
USSF Development Academy bio

1993 births
Living people
American soccer players
Duke Blue Devils men's soccer players
North Carolina Fusion U23 players
New York Red Bulls U-23 players
New York Red Bulls players
New York Red Bulls II players
Association football midfielders
Holmdel High School alumni
Homegrown Players (MLS)
Soccer players from New Jersey
USL League Two players
Major League Soccer players
United States men's youth international soccer players
People from Holmdel Township, New Jersey
Sportspeople from Long Branch, New Jersey
Sportspeople from Monmouth County, New Jersey
USL Championship players
American sportspeople of Japanese descent
Nashville SC players